2 Oceans FM (also known as Augusta Community Radio) is a community radio station based in Augusta, Western Australia,  south of Margaret River in the state's southwest. Transmitting from the Augusta Community Resource Centre in Allnutt Terrace, the station is run by volunteers from the Augusta community. On the station's website there is also an option to listen online through streaming over the internet.

History
The idea for the station came about due to frustration with the lack of local content on the very few radio stations broadcasting to the Augusta region. Attempts to acquire a frequency for the station to operate on began in 2002, but the Australian Communications and Media Authority (ACMA) specified that all the frequencies were being used by other local TV broadcasters. The founders of the station pushed on with support of local communities and, after initially requesting the frequency  in 2007, the ACMA allocated  for a community radio station in Augusta in April 2008. With the help of donations from Lotterywest, a local couple, and the South West Development Commission, 2 Oceans FM started broadcast in 2009.

See also
Augusta, Western Australia
Margaret River, Western Australia
List of radio stations in Australia

References

http://2oceansfm.com.au/

Radio stations in Western Australia
Augusta, Western Australia